The Dominickers are a small biracial or triracial ethnic group that was once centered in the Florida Panhandle county of Holmes, in a corner of the southern part of the county west of the Choctawhatchee River, near the town of Ponce de Leon. The group was classified in 1950 as one of the "reputed Indian-White-Negro racial isolates of the Eastern United States" by the United States Census Bureau.

Few facts are known about their origins, and little has been published about this group.

First mention and origins
The first known mention in print of the Dominickers is an article in Florida: A Guide to the Southernmost State, published by the Federal Writers' Project in 1939. The article "Ponce de Leon" identifies the Dominickers as being mixed-race descendants of the widow of a pre-Civil War plantation owner and one of her black slaves, by whom she had five children. (A separate oral tradition has it that the slave was the mixed-race or mulatto half-brother of the woman's deceased husband, but this has not been verified. In that account the half-brother's mother had been enslaved.)

The unsigned article said that numerous descendants still lived in the area at the time of writing. Their children were required to attend a segregated school (as required by Florida's Jim Crow laws). Dominickers were not accepted as social equals by the white community, but they kept themselves apart from the main black community. The Dominickers formed a small middle layer of Holmes County society separate from both whites and blacks (somewhat analogous to the status of free people of color, the Louisiana Creoles before the United States purchase of the Louisiana Territory).

According to the article, the appearance of Dominickers varied from very fair (white) to "Negroid" (black), even among the siblings of a single family. The nickname "Dominickers", taken as pejorative, was said to come from a local man in a divorce case describing his estranged wife as "black and white, like an old Dominicker chicken."  Another account says the description was applied, instead, to the man with whom she was living after she left her husband.

Further sources
Two unpublished typescripts prepared for the FWP Florida guidebook, but not included in it, are archived at the University of Florida library in Gainesville. They were likely sources or drafts of the published article.

These typescripts go into further detail than the published article on the appearance and behavior of the Dominickers, saying that the local people described them as "sensitive, treacherous, and vindictive" and "pathetically ignorant." The men are described as "big and burly looking," known for their skill at breaking horses and making moonshine whiskey.  The women were described as "low in stature, fat, and shapeless," wearing loose clothing and going barefoot all the time.

One article notes that Dominickers were "treated with the same courtesy that a Negro receives—never served at a public fountain nor introduced to a white person."  A few Dominicker children were allowed to attend the white high school in Westville, but they were "never allowed to actually graduate."

In contrast to these descriptions, photographs of known Dominickers from the late 19th and early 20th centuries show that their appearance ranged from fair-complected to swarthy, but not "Negroid," as claimed; the women, especially, seem to have had an olive-skinned, wavy-haired "Mediterranean" look. A later academic writer, a native of the area, states, "Most of these people are Spanish or Cuban in appearance."

Native American ancestry
The typescripts give five different accounts of the Dominickers' origins, which are said to include Euchee Indian ancestors. There may have originally been several distinct mixed-race families in the area, with various combinations of white, black, and Indian ancestry, whose descendants intermarried. Eventually they were all considered Dominickers. One typescript says, "they are about three-fourths white and one-eighth Negro and one-eighth Indian."

For example, one account pieced from various sources says that in the early nineteenth century, Jim Crow (no connection with the later segregation laws called by that name), an "Indian prince" and son of Chief Sam Story of the local Euchee Indians, married Harriet, a beautiful, "more than two-thirds white" enslaved house servant owned by a local white family. The interracial couple had a daughter, Eliza.  When the Euchee migrated to southern Florida in 1832, shortly after Sam Story's death, Harriet (who may have been her owner's daughter) and the baby stayed behind with the white family.  When Eliza grew up, she married a "yellow boy" (mixed-race with high proportion of white, such as quadroon or octoroon) named Jim Harris, son of a slave belonging to another white family. Their daughter, Lovey, eventually married another "yellow boy" and had a large family of good-looking children, who "married into another half-breed family." It is also said that other Euchee besides Jim Crow left many descendants (presumably mixed-race) in the area.

Many families in the Holmes County area claim Native American descent, especially from the Creek Indians, a larger nation of the Southeast with whom the Euchee were once affiliated.  The local Choctawhatchee Creek have organized and said to be seeking state recognition.

Census records
Federal censuses of Holmes and the adjacent counties of Walton and Washington dating to 1850 list many Dominicker families and individuals. They are variously identified as white, mulatto, and black (sometimes even among members of the same family, with parents given different classifications). Classifications for a given individual often changed from one census to the next, as they were dependent on the opinion of the census enumerator. The census records show that in the decades following the Civil War, many Dominickers married white spouses, and their children had increasingly even more white ancestry. In 1930 the Southern block in Congress had the census changed to reflect their binary system and one-drop rule: every individual was classified only as either black or white, hiding the large number of mixed-race individuals in the South.

The 1950 federal census instructed enumerators to make note of local populations of mixed white, black, and Indian ancestry in the eastern United States. In Holmes County, Florida, and nowhere else, 60 Dominickers were so counted, although they were designated as white on the census.

In 1956, a United States Public Health Service worker, who had tabulated the 1950 census findings, made a brief visit to the area. He interviewed some white residents but was unable to make contact with any Dominickers, said to number about 40 at that time.  His field notes indicate that at least one Dominicker was known to claim being of Spanish and Indian descent. He also noted that "the term Dominicker is not acceptable to the group and is not used in their presence."

Dispersal and assimilation
At some point in the 1960s, following the US Supreme Court decision in Brown v Board of Education ruling that segregated schools were unconstitutional, the school system closed the black school in Ponce de Leon. Students of color were integrated into the other local public schools. Some descendants of the Dominicker group still live in the area, but since World War II, many have scattered to other parts of the country. Those remaining in Holmes County and nearby localities have quietly assimilated into the white community. There is no organized affiliation of Dominicker descendants.

Similar groups in the region
The Dominickers are sometimes given a brief mention in sources discussing Melungeon people, or other tri-racial isolate groups. There is, however, no known link between the Dominickers and any other mixed-race group.

According to an account on Rootsweb, about 1857 more than 100 mixed-race families were said to migrate by wagon train from Holmes County to Rapides and Vernon parishes in Louisiana, where they became part of the mixed-race people known as Redbones. The Redbones have been known as a group in southwestern Louisiana, and their origins are still debated. There have been marriages between members of that group and relatives of the Holmes County Dominickers, but there is no evidence to suggest a common origin for the two groups.

Notes

References
Daniel J. Sharfstein, “The Secret History of Race in the United States,” Yale Law Journal, Volume 112, Number 6, March 2003. 
Direct link to the full text of the essay (PDF format):  

“Antebellum Louisiana and Alabama: Two Color Lines, Three Endogamous Groups,” October 15, 2004 
“The Antebellum South Rejects the One-Drop Rule,” November 15, 2004 
“The One-Drop Rule Arrives in the Postbellum Lower South,” October 1, 2005

External links
  Piney Woods History, a website that presents transcripts of original documents mentioning the Dominickers, as well as a number of local family trees, photographs, and other pertinent materials
 The Indians of North Florida, a website run by Dominickers of the Creek-Cheraw Indian Tribal Organization. This presents information and documents on community history, language and cultural preservation, an independent press and community newsletter, spiritual traditions, and activism related to communal economic development and educational programs that "lay the ground work for tribal self-sufficiency through individual responsibility and accomplishment."

Further reading
 Bird, Stephanie Rose. Light, Bright, and Damned Near White: Biracial and Triracial Culture in America. Praeger, 2009.
 Carswell, E. W. He Sold No 'Shine Before Its Time. Taylor Publications, 1981.
 Eidse, Faith. Voices of the Appalachicola. University Press of Florida, 2007.
 McGregory, Jerrilyn. Wiregrass Country. University Press of Mississippi, 1997.
 Sewell, Christopher Scott. Belles of the Creek Nation. Backintyme, 2011.
 Sewell, Christopher Scott. The Indians of North Florida: From Carolina to Florida, the Story of the Survival of a Distinct American Indian Community. Backintyme, 2011.

Multiracial ethnic groups in the United States
African–Native American relations
Ethnic groups in Florida
Native American history of Florida
African Americans in Florida
American Creole